Miller–Kite House, also known as Kite House, is a historic home located at Elkton, Rockingham County, Virginia. It was built in 1827, and is a two-story, five bay, "L"-shaped brick I-house dwelling.  It has a cross-gable roof with eaves decorated with sawnwork filigree. It is traditionally believed to have been the headquarters of General Stonewall Jackson during the time that the renowned Valley Campaign was planned in April 1862. The house is a town landmark and museum operated by the Elkton Historical Society.

It was listed on the National Register of Historic Places in 1979.

References

External links
 Miller–Kite House – Elkton Historical Society

Historic house museums in Virginia
Houses on the National Register of Historic Places in Virginia
Houses completed in 1827
Houses in Rockingham County, Virginia
Museums in Rockingham County, Virginia
National Register of Historic Places in Rockingham County, Virginia
American Civil War museums in Virginia
1827 establishments in Virginia
Jackson's Valley campaign